Chersotis capnistis is a moth of the family Noctuidae. It is found in most parts of the Near East and Middle East, west central Asia, eastward to western China and Afghanistan, southward to north and southwest Iran and the Levant.

Adults are on wing from July to October. There is one generation per year.

Subspecies
Chersotis capnistis capnistis (Turkmenistan)
Chersotis capnistis neara (Turkmenistan)
Chersotis capnistis glabripennis (southern Urals)
Chersotis capnistis schnacki (Greece)

External links
 Noctuinae of Israel

Noctuinae
Moths of Asia